Gary Sullivan is the host of the American nationally syndicated radio program At Home with Gary Sullivan.  The show is syndicated by Premiere Networks, a subsidiary of iHeartMedia, Inc. and is heard on many iHeart radio stations.  It airs on Saturdays and Sundays.

Gary Sullivan is a Cincinnati native and hosts the show from the studios of 550 WKRC (AM), the flagship station.  Sullivan first started working in a hardware store at age 16.  He attended the University of Cincinnati and eventually rose to the president and majority owner of a 16-unit hardware store chain.  Before beginning his nationally syndicated radio show in 2001, Sullivan hosted a TV show called "The Hardware Store," which aired on HGTV for four years.

References

External links
At Home with Gary Sullivan
At Home with Gary Sullivan on Premiere Networks

Year of birth missing (living people)
Living people
American talk radio hosts